Ladislav Hirjak (born 16 October 1995) is a Slovak footballer who currently plays for Slavoj Trebišov.

Club career

MFK Košice
Hirjak made his professional Fortuna Liga debut for Košice on 14 March 2015 against Spartak Myjava.

References

External links
Fortuna Liga profile

Futbalnet profile

1995 births
Living people
Slovak footballers
Association football midfielders
FC VSS Košice players
MŠK Novohrad Lučenec players
FC Lokomotíva Košice players
FK Slavoj Trebišov players
Slovak Super Liga players
2. Liga (Slovakia) players
People from Michalovce
Sportspeople from the Košice Region